Torre Futura is the highest tower of the complex at the World Trade Center San Salvador.

Description 
It has 20 floors for offices, five for parking, and a shopping plaza. It was developed by Grupo Agrisal and is described as an "intelligent building". A particular feature is the glass that makes up the structure, which occupies  of low emissivity that limits solar heat input and ultraviolet light, but takes full advantage of natural light. The structure was inaugurated on 1 December 2009 and is the second-highest tower of El Salvador. It is also amongst the most complex and modern buildings throughout Central America.

One of the main innovations of the Torre Futura is the implementation of a first-class shopping mall, called Plaza Futura, which has  and has exclusive restaurants and a viewpoint from where you can see much of the city.
Torre Futura was designed by KMD Architects. Its construction was overseen by the firm MR Melendez Arquitectos, headed by the salvadoran architect Manuel Roberto Melendez Bischitz.

Awards 

 Best Architectonic Design by "Architectural Digest".

See also 
 Plaza Futura
 World Trade Center San Salvador

External links 
 www.torrefutura.com

San Salvador
Skyscrapers in El Salvador
Skyscraper office buildings